Gavin Nicholas Mortimer is a British writer.

Career 
Educated at Mill Hill School in north London, Mortimer's first book, the critically acclaimed Fields of Glory: the extraordinary lives of 16 warrior sportsmen was published in 2001 and described by the Sunday Telegraph as "inspiring reading". Mortimer authored Stirling's Men in 2004, which covered rugby international and SAS commander Paddy Mayne, as well as other members of SAS 'Originals'. Mars & Minerva, the SAS regimental journal' described the book as "a fascinating insight into the Regiment's birth and its early years".

Mortimer has subsequently written histories of the Special Boat Squadron, Merrill's Marauders and the Long Range Desert Group, drawing on interviews with the men who served in these Special Forces units. He caused controversy in 2016 when he suggested that today's special forces lack the mental toughness of their forebears.

Mortimer has acted as a consultant to several television documentaries including the three-part BBC series about the wartime SAS, which was broadcast in 2017.

In addition to his military history, Mortimer has written several narrative non-fiction books, including The Great Swim, about the race to become the first woman to swim the English Channel. Dramatised on BBC Radio 4 in 2010,

He has contributed to BBC History magazine, History Revealed, WW2 magazine and The Spectator.

Publications 
Non-fiction

Fields of Glory (2001), 
Stirling's Men: inside story of the SAS in WW2 (2004) 
Longest Night (2005) 
The Great Swim (2007) 
Chasing Icarus (2008) 
Double Death (2009) 
The Blitz (2010) 
The Daring Dozen (2011) 
The SAS in  WW2 (2012) 
A History of Football in 100 Objects (2012) 
A History of Cricket in 100 Objects (2013) 
Merrill's Marauders (2013) 
The SBS in WW2 (2014) 
The First Eagles (2015) 
The Men Who Made the SAS (2015) 
History of the Long Range Desert Group in WW2 (2017) 
Guidance from the Greatest: What the World War Two Generation can teach us (2020) 
The SAS in Occupied France: 1 SAS Operations, June to October 1944 (2021) 
Z Special Unit: The Elite Allied World War II Guerrilla Force (2022) 
David Stirling: The Phoney Major: The Life, Times and Truth about the Founder of the SAS (2022) 

Children's

The Ultimate Guide to Rugby (2007) The Story of Yellow Leaf: Journal of a Sioux Girl (2008) The Voyage of Shackleton's Endurance'' (2008)

References

External links 
Official website
 

Year of birth missing (living people)
Living people
British writers
British historians